Francis John Nathaniel Curzon, 3rd Viscount Scarsdale (28 July 1924 – 2 August 2000), was a British peer.

Life
Curzon was the son of Francis Nathaniel Curzon, third son of Alfred Curzon, 4th Baron Scarsdale (1831–1916). Educated at Eton College, he became an officer in the Scots Guards. He was also a first cousin of Richard Curzon, 2nd Viscount Scarsdale, who slowly abandoned hopes of a male heir after his first wife had produced four daughters and he had failed to father a son and heir with his second wife. In 1959, he invited Francis Curzon, a cousin he hardly knew, to see the estate for the first time. 

In 1970, the heir presumptive took charge of his future inheritance as estate manager, and in 1977 he succeeded to the titles and estates, amounting to 5,700 acres in Derbyshire, including a 500-acre park and an 18-hole golf course.

As the new Lord Scarsdale, he began as owner of Kedleston Hall, Robert Adam rebuilt it for the first Lord Curzon during the 1760s, and housed a collection of paintings by Tintoretto and Poussin, and of Chippendale furniture. However, the new owner knew, even before death duties of £2.5m, that he could not maintain the great house on the basis of income from the estate's seventeen farms and 20,000 visitors a year. The house was ”a gigantic headache”, he wanted to preserve it, and he offered it to the nation in lieu of death duties. The Environment Secretary Michael Heseltine was sympathetic, as were arts ministers Norman St John-Stevas and Lord Gowrie. Margaret Thatcher consequently viewed the house.

Whilst waiting for a decision, Scarsdale came into conflict with his son and heir, Peter Curzon, to whom he had promised a tenth of the estate if it were sold. Peter wanted to wait for a £25m offer from overseas, which never occurred. On the British government not wanting to acquire the house, Scarsdale spent ten years trying to persuade the National Trust to buy it. In 1987, the Trust agreed to acquire Kedleston Hall and its estate, thanks to being financed by an unprecedented £14 million, mainly from the National Heritage Memorial Fund. Scarsdale struck what seemed a generous deal with the National Trust. He and his successors could live rent-free in a 23-room wing, with an adjoining garden and two rent-free flats for his servants or other family members. He could play billiards and hold parties in the main part of the house and shoot pheasants in the park when it was closed to the public. However, the annual maintenance costs of £400,000 were to be met wholly by the National Trust. 

Sadly, Scarsdale ended his life campaigning for a dozen years against the National Trust’s alterations to his ancestral home. The conflict came from differing interpretations of the word "consult" in the transfer agreement. He thought he could veto any changes; the Trust insisted he would only be informed, as a courtesy. He wanted the house to be kept as a "family home"; the Trust wanted it restored to its 1760s glory. Scarsdale attacked the trust's "arrogance", "vandalism" and "sacrilege", for such things as removing a fountain or a favourite piece of furniture. 

Scarsdale died on 2 August 2000, after a long illness.

Family

Curzon married Solange Yvonne Palmyre Ghislaine Hanse on 3 July 1948. They divorced in 1967 and she died on 4 July 1974. They had four children: 

 Peter Curzon, 4th Viscount Scarsdale, born 6 Mar 1949
 John Daniel Curzon, born 15 Jan 1952, died 24 Jan 1952
 Hon. Annette Yvonne Curzon, born 28 Oct 1953
 Hon. David James Nathaniel Curzon, born 3 Feb 1958

His second wife was Helene Gladys Frances Thomson, married on 5 June 1968. They had two children:

 Hon. Richard Francis Nathaniel Curzon, born 30 Jan 1969
 Hon. James Fergus Nathaniel Curzon, born 12 Sep 1970

References

External links

1924 births
Viscounts Scarsdale
2000 deaths
Francis
Scarsdale